The 2002 Italian Formula Three Championship was the 38th Italian Formula Three Championship season. It began on 7 April at Vallelunga and ended on 20 October at Magione after nine races.

Miloš Pavlović of Target Racing won races at Vallelunga, Misano, Varano, Binetto, Mugello and had another three podiums and ultimately clinched the title. He finished 27 points clear of Azeta Racing driver Philip Cloostermans, who won races at Pergusa and Monza. Third place went to Pavlović's teammate Christiano Citron, who won the season-ending race at Magione.

Teams and drivers
{|
|

Notes

Calendar
All rounds were held in Italy.

Standings
Points are awarded as follows:

References

External links
 Official website

Italian Formula Three Championship seasons
Formula Three
Italian
Italian Formula 3 Championship